Martina Hingis and Jamie Murray were the defending champions, but Hingis retired from professional tennis at the end of 2017. Murray successfully defended his title alongside Bethanie Mattek-Sands, defeating Alicja Rosolska and Nikola Mektić, 2–6, 6–3, [11–9] to win the mixed doubles tennis title at the 2018 US Open

Seeds

Draw

Finals

Top half

Bottom half

References

External links
 Main Draw
2018 US Open – Doubles draws and results at the International Tennis Federation

Mixed Doubles
US Open – Mixed Doubles
US Open – Mixed Doubles
US Open (tennis) by year – Mixed doubles